Calosoma mirificus is a species of ground beetle in the subfamily of Carabinae. It was described by Casale in 1979.

References

mirificus
Beetles described in 1979